Sandra Gugliotta (born July 13, 1969, in Buenos Aires) is an Argentine film director, screenplay writer, and producer.

According to film critic Joel Poblete, who writes for Mabuse, a cinema magazine, Sandra Gugliotta is one of the members of the so-called "New Argentina Cinema" which began c. 1998.

Filmography 
Directing
 Noches áticas (1995)
 Un Día de suerte (2002) aka A Lucky Day
 Las Vidas posibles (2006) aka Possible Lives

Awards 
Wins
 Berlin International Film Festival: Caligari Film Award; Don Quixote Award - Special Mention; 2002.
 Ankara Flying Broom International Women's Film Festival: FIPRESCI Prize; 2002.

Nominations
 Argentine Film Critics Association Awards: Silver Condor; Best First Film, Sandra Gugliotta; 2003.
 Buenos Aires International Festival of Independent Cinema: Best Film, Sandra Gugliotta; 2002.
 Goya Awards: Goya; Best Spanish Language Foreign Film, Sandra Gugliotta; 2003.  
 Miami Latin Film Festival: Golden Egret Best Film; Sandra Gugliotta ; 2003.

Footnotes

External links 
 

1969 births
Argentine film directors
Argentine women film directors
Argentine film producers
Argentine women film producers
Argentine screenwriters
Women screenwriters
Living people
People from Buenos Aires